Kopačka may refer to:

Kopačka (folklore ensemble) - a folklore musical ensemble from the Republic of Macedonia
Kopačka (folk dance) - a Macedonian oro, folk dance, from the Republic of Macedonia